Taissa is a feminine given name. Notable people with the name include:
 Taissa Farmiga (born 1994), American actress
 Taissa S. Hauser (1942-2014), American sociologist

Feminine given names